Dieter Carl Wasshausen (born 15 April 1938 in Jena, Germany) is an American botanist specialized in Spermatophytes.
In 1962 he started working at the Smithsonian Institution as a technician. In 1976 he became chairman of the Botany Department, a post he held until 1982 He studied at the George Washington University receiving a PhD in 1972. Wasshausen has described approximately 247 new species in various families, and five new species have been named for him.

References

1938 births
Living people
21st-century American botanists
George Washington University alumni